İzmir is a Turkish province divided into two electoral districts of the Grand National Assembly of Turkey. It elects twenty-six members of parliament (deputies) to represent the province of the same name for a four-year term by the D'Hondt method, a party-list proportional representation system.

Members 
Population reviews of each electoral district are conducted before each general election, which can lead to certain districts being granted a smaller or greater number of parliamentary seats. İzmir is the third largest province in Turkey and saw an increase in its seat allocation ahead of the 2011 election to 26 members, 13 per district.

The province's administrative districts (ilçe) are divided among two electoral districts as follows:

General elections

2011

June 2015

November 2015

2018

Presidential elections

2014

References 

Politics of İzmir Province